Kevin Knox may refer to:
Kevin Knox (American football) (born 1971), former American football wide receiver
Kevin Knox (basketball) (born 1999), American basketball player for the Atlanta Hawks, and the son of the above player